St Alban Hall, sometimes known as St Alban's Hall or Stubbins, was one of the medieval halls of the University of Oxford, and one of the longest-surviving. It was established in the 13th century, acquired by neighbouring Merton College in the 16th century but operated separately until the institutions merged in the late 19th century. The site in Merton Street, Oxford, is now occupied by Merton's Edwardian St Alban's Quad.

History
St Alban Hall took its name from Robert of Saint Alban, a citizen of Oxford, who conveyed the property to the priory of nuns at Littlemore, near Oxford, about the year 1230.

In February 1525, on the recommendation of Thomas Wolsey, Lord Chancellor, as a result of the Littlemore Priory scandals, the priory was dissolved. Its lands and houses in Oxford passed to Wolsey for the use of his new Cardinal College. When Wolsey fell from power in 1529, Littlemore Priory, along with the rest of his wealth and estates, escheated to the Crown. Henry VIII then granted St Alban Hall to George Owen, D.M., who was both the king's physician and a Fellow of Merton College. Owen conveyed it to Sir John Williams, later Lord Williams of Thame, and Sir John Gresham. By permission of Edward VI, in 1547 they transferred the Hall to John Pollard and Robert Perrot, Esquires, who sold it to the Warden and Fellows of Merton College.

St Alban Hall continued for another three centuries as a separate hall with its own students and principal. It was governed by the university's statutes for Academical Halls, and its principal was chosen by the chancellor of the university.

Chancellor Grenville appointed Richard Whately as principal in 1825, in an attempt to raise standards there. John Henry Newman was Whately's vice-principal from 1825 to 1826, and Samuel Hinds from 1827 to 1831.

As later recalled by Dr Henry Robinson, in 1832 there was only one undergraduate, a man named Tenant, who was known as "the solitary tenant of Alban Hall". There were seven members when Robinson arrived in 1838, rising to twelve by the time he came down. The only tutor was the vice-principal, while the principal, Edward Cardwell, was a university lecturer on divinity. Those aiming for an honours degree took a private tutor, of whom Bob Lowe of Magdalen was the most popular. The Hall then had four servants, a cook, a manciple, a porter, and a boy. Robinson had found St Alban Hall "rather an expensive place, the number being so few, and there was no endowment."

The last principal, William Salter, was appointed in 1861 and resigned in 1882. In 1877 Prime Minister Disraeli appointed commissioners under Lord Selborne and later Mountague Bernard to consider and implement reform of the university and its colleges. The commissioners came to the view that the four remaining medieval halls were not viable and should merge with colleges. In 1881, the commissioners made a University Statute which provided for St Alban Hall to be united with Merton College in the event of Principal Salter's resignation or death. The Hall then had eighteen members in residence, who were admitted to Merton. In 1887, a similar Statute extinguished New Inn Hall and combined it with Balliol College, on the death of Henry Hubert Cornish. In the event, of the halls only St Edmund Hall would avoid merger.

Henry Robinson cast some of the blame for the end of the Hall on Lord Salisbury, the university's chancellor: 

Robinson died a few days after his article was published.

Buildings 

St Alban Hall's buildings included a main quadrangle and a smaller court. The Merton Street front of the quad was rebuilt in 1600, funded by Benedict Barnham. The buildings were reconstructed again and a chapel added by John Gibbs from 1863, funded by Principal Salter. After 1882 the chapel was no longer needed and was secularized. Between 1904 and 1910 the buildings of the former hall were demolished, apart from part of their front elevation on Merton Street, and the St Alban's Quadrangle of Merton College built on the site.

Principals

A list of the principals of St Alban Hall.
1437: Roger Martin
1439: Robert Ashe
1444: John Gygur
1450: William Shyrefe
1452: William Romsey
1468–1477: Thomas Danett
1477: Richard FitzJames, later Bishop of London
Thomas Lynley
Robert Gosbourne
Ralph Hamsterley
1501: Hugh Saunders, alias Shakspeere
1503: John Forster
1507: John Beverstone
1507: William Bysse
1509: Richard Walker
1510: John Pokyswell
1514: John Hoper
Simon Balle
1527: Walter Buckler
1530: Robert Tailer
1532: William Pedyll
1535: Robert Huyck
1536: Richard Smyth, also first Regius Professor of Divinity at Oxford
1539: Humphrey Burneford
1543: John Estwyck
1547: William Marshall
1567: Arthur Atye
Richard Radclyffe

1599: Robert Masters
1603: Henry Masters
1614: Anthony Morgan
1621: Richard Parker
1624: Edward Chaloner
1625–1661: Richard Zouch
1641: Sir Giles Sweit
1664–1673: Thomas Lamplugh
1673–1679: Narcissus Marsh
1679: Thomas Bouchier
1692: Richard Duckworth 
1723: James Bouchier
1736: Robert Leyborne
1759: Francis Randolph

1797–1823: Thomas Winstanley
1823–1825: Peter Elmsley
1825–1831: Richard Whately, later Archbishop of Dublin 
1831–1861: Edward Cardwell
1861–1882: William Charles Salter

Notable alumni

Cuthbert Mayne (c. 1543–1577), Roman Catholic priest executed in the time of Elizabeth I
Sir Thomas Gresham (died 1630), landowner and member of parliament
Robert Harcourt (died 1631), explorer
Thomas Crompton (died 1608), a barrister and judge 
Thomas Lawton (c. 1558–1606), a barrister and judge
John Penry (1563–1593), Welsh Protestant martyr
Matthew Slade (1569–1628), nonconformist minister 
Gervase Clifton, 1st Baron Clifton (c. 1570–1618), landowner and peer
Edward Lapworth (1574–1636), physician and Latin poet
Philip Massinger (1583–1640), dramatist
William Lenthall (1591–1662), Speaker of the House of Commons
Samuel Turner (c. 1582–1647), Cavalier soldier
Sir Richard Browne, 1st Baronet, of Deptford (died 1683), English ambassador to France
Richard Alleine (1610/11–1681), Puritan divine
William Alleine (1614–1677), clergyman
Bartholomew Ashwood (1622–1680), puritan divine
John Durel (1625–1683), clergyman 
Francis Willis (1718–1807), physician
John Evans (1756–1846), Welsh surgeon and cartographer
Stephen Reay (1782–1861), Laudian Professor of Arabic
Nathaniel Dawes (1843–1910), Anglican bishop in Australia
Edward Smith (1854–1908), clergyman and first class cricketer

Notes

External links
Henry Robinson, DD, "St Alban Hall, Oxford" in London Society, January 1887, reprinted in Volume 51, London: F. V. White & Co., 1887, pp. 191–198

St Alban Hall, Oxford
Former colleges and halls of the University of Oxford
1882 disestablishments in England
Buildings and structures demolished in 1905
Demolished buildings and structures in England